Frost may refer to two distinct weather phenomena:
 Frost (temperature), a value of air temperature less or equal than the freezing point of water (0 °C, 32 °F)
 Frost, a solid deposition of ice on surfaces and objects

Frost may also refer to:

People
Frost (surname)
David Frost (1939–2013), British broadcaster and presenter
Nick Frost, English comedian and actor 
Robert Frost, an American poet

Places
In the United States
 Frost, Kentucky
 Frost, Louisiana, an unincorporated community
 Frost, Minnesota, a town 
 Frost, Ohio, an unincorporated community
 Frost, Texas, a city 
 Frost, West Virginia, an unincorporated community
 Frost Township, Michigan, United States
In England
Frostenden, Suffolk, a village
Elsewhere
 Frost (crater), a lunar crater

Entertainment

Music
Performers
 Frost (Australian band), a pop rock band
 Frost (Norwegian band), an electronica band
 Frost (musician), Kjetil-Vidar Haraldstad, Norwegian drummer for Satyricon 
 Frost (rapper), American rapper
 Frost*, an English neo-progressive rock supergroup
 The Frost, a late-1960s American psychedelic rock band

Albums
 Frost (album), an album by Enslaved
 Frost (Monofader album)

Other media
 Frost (collection), stories by Donald Wandrei featuring detective I.V. Frost
 Frost (comics), a character from the Noble Causes series published by Image Comics
 Frost (Mortal Kombat), a character in the Mortal Kombat fighting game series
 Frost, a 6th Universe counterpart of Frieza in the Dragon Ball Super manga and anime
 Mary Elizabeth Bartowski, code named "Frost" in the U.S. TV series Chuck
 Emma Frost or simply Frost, a character from Marvel Comics
 Frost (Bernhard novel), a novel by Thomas Bernhard
Frost (Bailey novel), a novel by Robin Wayne Bailey
 Frost (2017 film), a Lithuanian film
 Frost (2012 film), a Canadian short drama film
 Killer Frost, the name of 2 fictional villains in DC Comics
 Tina "Frost" Lin Tsang, a playable Operator in Tom Clancy's Rainbow Six Siege
 Frost, a playable character in Warframe
 A Touch of Frost, a British television show about a police detective
 A Touch of Frost (novel), a 1987 crime novel

Other uses
 Frost House (disambiguation), any of several places
 Frost Art Museum at Florida International University
 Frost heaving, the process by which the freezing of water-saturated soil causes the deformation and upward thrust of the ground surface
 Frost National Bank, a bank based in San Antonio, Texas, USA
 Frostenden, Suffolk, England

See also
 Frosting (disambiguation)
 Frosty (disambiguation)
 Jack Frost (disambiguation)